The Faiyum Oasis ( Waḥet El Fayyum) is a depression or basin in the desert immediately west of the Nile river, 62 miles south of Cairo, Egypt. The extent of the basin area is estimated at between 1,270 km2 (490 mi2) and 1,700 km2 (656 mi2). The basin floor comprises fields watered by a channel of the Nile, the Bahr Yussef, as it drains into a desert hollow to the west of the Nile Valley. The Bahr Yussef veers west through a narrow neck of land north of Ihnasya, between the archaeological sites of El Lahun and Gurob near Hawara; it then branches out, providing agricultural land in the Faiyum basin, draining into the large saltwater Lake Moeris (Birket Qarun). In prehistory it was a freshwater lake, but is today a saltwater lake. It is a source for tilapia and other fish for the local area.

Differing from typical oases, whose fertility depends on water obtained from springs, the cultivated land in the Faiyum is formed of Nile mud brought by the Bahr Yussef canal, 24 km (15 miles) in length. Between the beginning of Bahr Yussef at El Lahun to its end at the city of Faiyum, several canals branch off to irrigate the Faiyum Governorate. The drainage water flows into Lake Moeris.

History 

After the Mediterranean reflooded at the end of the Miocene, the Nile canyon became an arm of the sea reaching inland further than Aswan. Over geological time that sea arm gradually filled with silt and became the Nile valley.

Eventually the Nile valley bed silted up high enough to let the Nile periodically overflow into the Faiyum Hollow forming a lake. The lake is first recorded from about 3000 BC, around the time of Menes (Narmer). However, for the most part, it would only be filled with high flood waters. The lake was bordered by neolithic settlements, and the town of Crocodilopolis grew up on the south where the higher ground created a ridge.

In 2300 BC, the waterway from the Nile river to the natural lake was widened and deepened to make a canal which is now known as the Bahr Yussef. This canal fed into the lake. This was meant to serve three purposes: control the flooding of the Nile, regulate the water level of the Nile during dry seasons, and serve the surrounding area with irrigation. There is evidence of ancient Egyptian pharaohs of the twelfth dynasty using the natural lake of Faiyum as a reservoir to store surpluses of water for use during the dry periods. The immense waterworks undertaken by the ancient Egyptian pharaohs of the twelfth dynasty to transform the lake into a huge water reservoir gave the impression that the lake itself was an artificial excavation, as reported by classic geographers and travellers. The lake was eventually abandoned due to the nearest branch of the Nile dwindling in size from 230 BC.

Faiyum was known to the ancient Egyptians as the twenty-first nome of Upper Egypt, Atef-Pehu ("Northern Sycamore"). In ancient Egyptian times, its capital was Sh-d-y-t (usually written "Shedyt"), called by the Greeks Crocodilopolis, and refounded by Ptolemy II as Arsinoe.

This region has the earliest evidence for farming in Egypt, and was a center of royal pyramid and tomb-building in the Twelfth dynasty of the Middle Kingdom, and again during the rule of the Ptolemaic dynasty. Faiyum became one of the breadbaskets of the Roman world.

For the first three centuries AD, the people of Faiyum and elsewhere in Roman Egypt not only embalmed their dead but also placed a portrait of the deceased over the face of the mummy wrappings, shroud or case. The Egyptians continued their practice of burying their dead, despite the Roman preference for cremation. Preserved by the dry desert environment, these Faiyum portraits make up the richest body of portraiture to have survived from antiquity. They provide a window into a society of peoples of mixed origins—Egyptians, Greeks, Romans, Syrians, Libyans and others—that flourished 2,000 years ago in Faiyum. The Faiyum portraits were painted on wood in a pigmented wax technique called encaustic.In the late 1st millennium AD, the arable area shrank, and settlements around the edge of the basin were abandoned. These sites include some of the best-preserved from the late Roman Empire, notably Karanis, and from the Byzantine and early Arab Periods, though recent redevelopment has greatly reduced the archaeological features. In addition to the mummy portraits, the villages of the Faiyum have also proven to be a source of papyrus fragments containing literature and documents in Latin, Greek, and Egyptian scripts.

"Colonial-type" village names (villages named after towns elsewhere in Egypt and places outside Egypt) show that much land was brought into cultivation in the Faiyum in the Greek and Roman periods.

According to the Encyclopædia Britannica Eleventh Edition, in 1910 over 1,000 km2 (400 mile2) of the Faiyum Oasis was cultivated, the chief crops being cereals and cotton. The completion of the Aswan Low Dam ensured a supply of water, which enabled 20,000 acres (80 km2) of land, previously unirrigated and untaxed, to be brought under cultivation in the years 1903-1905. Three crops were obtained in twenty months. The province was noted for its figs, grapes, and Olives. Rose trees were numerous, and most of the attar of roses (rose oil) of Egypt was manufactured in the province. Faiyum also raised its own variety of sheep.

Archaeology
In the neighborhood of the lake, are many ruins of ancient villages and cities. Mounds north of the city of Faiyum mark the site of Crocodilopolis/Arsinoe. Archaeological remains across the region extend from the prehistoric period to modern times, e.g. the Monastery of the Archangel Gabriel at Naqlun.

The cult of Sobek 
In antiquity, the Fajyum was a center of the cult of the crocodile god Sobek. In many settlements, temples were dedicated to local manifestations of the god and associated divinities. The priests of Sobek were key players in social and economic life; for example by organizing religious festivals or by purchasing goods from local producers. The development of temples dedicated to the Sobek cult can be studied particularly well in Bakchias, Narmouthis, Soknopaiou Nesos, Tebtunis, and Theadelphia, since many written sources (papyri, ostraka, inscriptions) on the daily life of the priests are available there.

Egyptian temples have been operating at the edges of the Fayyum at least until the early third century and in some cases in the fourth century. The institutionalized Sobek cults existed alongside early Christian communities, which settled in the region from the third century onwards and built their first churches in the Fayyum settlements by the fourth century.

Birket Qarun lake

Birket Qarun (Arabic for Lake of Qarun), is located in the Faiyum Oasis and has an abundant population of fish, notably bulti, of which considerable quantities are sent to Cairo. In ancient times this lake was much larger, and the ancient Greeks and Romans called it Lake Moeris.

Cities and towns
The largest city is Faiyum, which is also the capital of the Faiyum Governorate. Other towns include Sinnuris and Tamiya to the north of Faiyum, and Sanhur and Ibsheway on the road to the lake.

In popular culture
The oasis is the setting for about a quarter of Paolo Coelho's The Alchemist, one of the top 20 best-selling books in the world.

See also
Bahr Yussef canal
Faiyum
Faiyum Governorate
Farafra
Fayum mummy portraits
Lake Moeris
Monastery of the Archangel Gabriel at Naqlun
Pedestals of Biahmu
Phiomia (an extinct relative of the elephant, named after Faiyum)
Roman Egypt

Notes

References
 The Hydraulics of Open Channel Flow: An Introduction

Faiyum Governorate
Geography of ancient Egypt
Oases of Egypt